Johann Freiherr von Appel (also Baron Johann von Appel), (b. 11 November 1826, Sikirevci, Slavonski Brod; 7. September 1906, Gradisca d'Isonzo) was an Austro-Hungarian general and administrator. He was the Austrian governor of Bosnia and Herzegovina between 1882 and 1903.

Notes

1826 births
1906 deaths
Governors of Bosnia and Herzegovina
Barons of Austria
Knights Cross of the Military Order of Maria Theresa
Austro-Hungarian generals